Legend of Nine Tails Fox is a 2016 Chinese television series based on six tales in Strange Stories from a Chinese Studio by Pu Songling. It originally aired two episodes daily on Hunan TV, Sunday through Tuesday at 22:00 as well as simultaneously broadcast online on Youku, Tencent, Sohu and iQiyi. The drama was directed by Liu Yufen, Gao Linbao and Xu Huikang, and stars an ensemble cast of actors. The drama is separated into six plots based on the corresponding stories in the Strange Tales from a Chinese Studio.

Synopsis 
Adapted from six tales of Strange Stories from a Chinese Studio, the plot begins when a magic fruit of Qing Qiu is stolen with Fei Yue as the only witness.

"A Xiu" (ep. 1-7): Exorcist Zhuo Yun accuses the fox spirit Hua Yue of being a homewrecker, causing pain to mortals. After a short battle, Hua Yue manages to escape but injures her ankle while saving a mortal woman named A Xiu. To repay Hua Yue for saving her life, A Xiu takes Hua Yue home to recover and the two become good friends. While hiding in A Xiu's father's home, Hua Yue discovers A Xiu is also hiding a relationship with Liu Zigu, an incompetent scholar. A Xiu's father moves the family away to marry his daughter off to someone else, prompting Zigu to attempt suicide. Fearing he would try again after she saved him, Hua Yue turns herself into A Xiu to buy time before the real A Xiu can return. However, Hua Yue receives news of A Xiu's sudden death so she continues to act as A Xiu, despite Zhuo Yun's warnings. It turns out A Xiu didn't die and finally returns to Zigu, but Hua Yue has already fallen in love with Zigu as well, so the three are caught in a love triangle and Zigu is unable to pick between the two women. Meanwhile, one of Hua Yue's suitors was murdered by another demon spirit and Zhuo Yun mistakenly believes it was Hua Yue's doing, so he attacks her, but A Xiu jumps in between them and dies from the blow. Eventually, Hua Yue sacrifices her years of cultivation to bring A Xiu back, her beautiful appearance being reduced to her true aged appearance, and returns to Qing Qiu alone.

"Feng San Niang" (ep. 7-12): Fox Granny tracks the magic fruit thief to the Meng family's estate, home of Meng Ande and Meng Anren, who is rumored to be an unscrupulous court official. As Fox Granny prepares to send Liu Changyan to retrieve the magic fruit, Fei Yue also sneaks in as the handmaiden of Fan Qianru, Meng Ande's wife. During her search of the magic fruit and investigation of Anren, Fei Yue falls in love with him but soon realizes Anren will prioritize his own agenda over anyone else, including lying to her and offering her to the emperor. Meanwhile, Changyan correctly deduces Qianru is the actual thief and a golden fox of Qing Qiu. Out of frustration of being lied to, Fei Yue exposes Qianru's true form to her husband, who fears her. Back in Qing Qiu, Qianru admits she stole the magic fruit but also lost it during her battle with Fei Yue, and is imprisoned for her deeds. On Qianru's request, Fei Yue returns to the Meng estate to check on Ande and ultimately reconciles with Anren. As Anren prepares to marry Fei Yue and leave the courts for good, the emperor orders Anren to marry the princess. After Fei Yue is able to prove Anren's love for her, the princess grants them leave and Fei Yue also leaves Qing Qiu to spend time with Anren. Due to Changyan's plea for leniency, Fox Granny also releases Qianru from prison and Qianru convinces Ande to take her back.

"Ying Ning" (ep. 12-18): On Ying Ning's 16th birthday, she's finally able to visit the mortal realm, much to the dismay of her guardian Lan Yi. Immediately, she meets Wang Zifu, who lets her stay at his family's estate, where Ying Ning recognizes the same flower field and old barn from her nightmares. As the family's workers start seeing ghosts, Zifu's mother is forced to enlist exorcist Cao Fei to investigate and after an incident at the abandoned barn, Zifu learns of Ying Ning's fox identity. Eventually, Lan Yi comes to take Ying Ning back, but is interrupted by Cao Fei. After their battle, Lan Yi explains that her sister Lan Xiaodie fell in love with Zifu's uncle Qin Sheng and gave birth to Ying Ning. Years later, Zifu's first wife sent for the family of three, claiming to accept Xiaodie, which turned out to be a trap set up by Zifu's mother and Cao Fei, resulting in Xiaodie's death. Lan Yi convinces Ying Ning to return to Qing Qiu, but Zifu is able to convince Lan Yi (with the help of Hua Yue) that he truly loves Ying Ning and would protect her. After Zifu's mother's several schemes, Zifu and Ying Ning leave the Wang estate but Cao Fei murders Zifu to awaken Ying Ning's powers. Ying Ning wants revenge and is overcome with anger, enveloping her in a dark aura that slowly destroys her, but Zifu appears in a vision, persuading her to stop thinking about revenge, so Ying Ning decides to stay in the mortal realm to take care of the Wang family's business. Cao Fei also goes insane from taking multiple demonic cultivations for his own gain.

"Hu Si" (ep. 18-24): Silver fox spirit Hu Si has failed 76 relationships, so Fox Granny banishes him to the mortal realm until he understands true love. In the mortal realm, he meets Zhong Qing, who was left at the altar by her betrothed, Zhang Sheng. Infuriated, Zhong Qing asks Hu Si to help her seek revenge by killing Zhang Sheng, who is also hunted by Maoshan Heidao, another fox clan that murders womanizers. Unfortunately, Hu Si accidentally loses his memory and mistakes Zhang Sheng for his best friend and savior, so Hu Si becomes attached to Zhang Sheng. As they travel, they run into Zhong Qing, who pretends not to know either of them, so Zhang Sheng asks her to act as Hu Si's betrothed so he can secretly get rid of both of them. Before long, the three are caught in a web of affection but mistrust until Maoshan Heidao restores Hu Si's memory to resume his plan for revenge, but instead Hu Si forces Zhong Qing and Zhang Sheng to admit their love for each other while showing Maoshan Heidao that Zhang Sheng isn't a womanizer, so Maoshan Heidao turns over a new leaf, changing her name to Xiao Hua, and Hu Si leaves Qing Qiu for her.

"Chang Ting": A wolf demon breaks into the Weng estate, stealing the magic fruit from Hui Er, the second uncle. Weng Changting and exorcist Shi Taipu both chase after the wolf demon, but lose her after Shi is injured and the wolf demon is secretly killed by Hui Er, devastating the wolf demon's husband and prompting him to put a curse on Hongting as revenge. Changting asks Shi to stay at their estate to help get rid of the wolf demon, but he soon realizes the entire Weng family and the workers are foxes. Despite his discovery, he stays to keep the Weng family safe but severs his friendship with Changting. As the wolf demon's threat draws near, Changting pleads to Shi to teach her demon-slaying skills to protect her family, but as her skills are not enough, her father decides to let the two lovers marry if Shi protects the family. However, the father regrets his decision, and tries to get rid of him. On their wedding day, Shi is poisoned and left for dead while the whole Weng family escapes with the unconscious Changting. Shi Taipu returns to his temple and attempts to kill the entire family, but after Changting sacrifices herself to protect him, he saves her against his master's wishes. The two later live together in solitude, but Changting is later called back by Chang Yan to help look for Hui Er.

"Heng Niang": The goddess Nuwa gives the foxes one last chance and tells Liu Chang Yan to seek the nine-tailed guardian fox, Tao Heng, for her help to defeat Hui Er and find the baby girl that is destined to save the fox nation. The two disguise themselves as a couple and infiltrate the capital. Their neighbor, Ms. Hong, seeks Tao Heng's help to win back her husband's favor from his concubine, Ying Er. Tao advises her to refute any of his affections toward her, and live a less luxurious lifestyle as a worker with the servants; Ms. Hong later succeeds and reconciles with her husband. Meanwhile, Ninth young master falls in love with Tao Heng at first sight and asks Liu to go on a business trip so that he can go on a spring trip with Liu's "wife". However, he ends up humiliating himself in front of her. Angry that Mr. Hong has only eyes on his wife, Ying Er decides to seduce Ninth young master, while also realizing Tao Heng is responsible of Mr. Hong's change of heart. Hui Er suddenly breaks into Ninth young master's room and persuades him to kill Liu Chang Yan to get Tao Heng. The murder fails; they also find out Tao is with child, but ninth master wants it dead. Mr. Hong helps the couple escape back to Qing Qiu after their mission is complete, but when Hui Er later appears and kidnaps the child, the child defeats him and recovers the Mei fruit.

Cast 

A Xiu
 Chen Yao as Hua Yue
 Zhang Ruoyun as Liu Zi Gu
 Qiao Xin as A Xiu
 Yao Yi Chen as Zuo Yun
 Wengfu as the mountain demon
 Wang Chunyuan as A Xiu's father
 Qu Zheming as Gao young master
 Mei Fet As Yeon Mow

Feng San Niang
 Jiang Kaitong as Feng Feiyue
 Zhai Tianlin as Meng Anren
 Chen Tingjia as Fan Qianru
 Wang Chuang as Meng Ande
 Dai Xuyi as He Liang
 Hai Ling as the princess
 Su Mao as Prime minister Zhao Gang
 Zong Fengyan as the Emperor

Ying Ning
 Yang Caiqi as Ying Ning
 Fu Xinbo as Wang Zifu
 Wang Ni'en as Lan XiaoDie
 Wang Yansu as Lan Yi (aunt)
 Li Qinqin as Wang's mother
 Zhang Lei as Cao Daozhang
 Li Sicheng as Wu Sheng

Hu Si 
 Mike D'Angelo as Hu Si/Gu Yue
 Tang Yi Xin as Zhong Qing/Jing Qing
 Chen Ruoxuan as Zhang Sheng/Niu Yi
 Tao Yang as Xiao Shi
 Fu Mei as Maoshao Heidao
 Gong Fangmin as Old boss

Chang Ting
 Gina Jin as Weng Changting
 Wang Kai as Shi Taipu
 Zhang Xueying as Weng Hongting
 Fu Juan as Old man Weng
 Shao Min as Weng's mother
 Li Yu as Hui'er
 Zhang Haoran as Wolf demon
 Fei Er as Wolf demon's wife
 Ye Kaiwen as Xiao Shitou

Heng Niang
 Jiang Jinfu as Liu Chang Yan
 Guli Nazha as Tao Heng
 Liu Yase as Su Xi
 Wang Zhixuan as Ninth Consort
You Jingru as Ying Er
 Qiang Yu as Ninth young master
 Jiang Chen as Zhu Shi

Others 
 Qiao Hong as Fox grandmother
 Zhu Pengcheng as Hong Pao Lao Dao
 Yue Junling as Bai Pao Lao Dao
 Wang Yonglin as Liu Jiading
 Wang Zhen as Xiao Taozi

Production 

Legend of the Nine-tails Fox'''s production team constructed the six stories in a fantasy world that tells love, joy, and sorrows. The fox spirits mysterious charm and attitude in Chinese classical literature was inspiration for the many characters. Other than the three directors, Liu Yufen, Gao Linbao, and Xu Huikang, notable players in the production process include Wang Lizhi and  Fang Qiang Qiang as screenwriters, as director of photography Gao Xinjian, Li Da Chao and Li Lei as action/stunt team directors, Wu Baoling as the artistic/visual director. Cai Yi Nong, a producer, revealed that the formation of the Legend of Nine Tails Fox stories were completely by accident, and that she and several co-screenwriters chatted about the story in Hangzhou during a vacation. They wanted to do an original fantasy story with Strange Tales, with the fox's view of the world as its main structure.

The setting of the drama has been compared to The Wizard of Ozs fantasy world. In the trailer, the use of aerial shots was also incorporated with traditional shooting. The drama's trailer revealed up to 80 special effects (CGI) shots, with many involving mammals (foxes, rats, etc.), fighting scenes, towering trees and magic effects. The filming crew traveled to Sichuan and other locations, including 4000-meter high Hengduan Mountain ranges in Daocheng County. Location filming began on April 21, 2015 at Hengdian World Studios, and ended in July 2015, where it entered post-production. "Heng Niang" was filmed in Zhejiang Xiandu, while "Chang Ting" was shot at in the streets of Hengdian.

On December 28, 2015, Zi Long Hu Entertainment announced that a role-playing mobile game based on the series would be created. Also called Legend of Nine Tails Fox, it was released on January 21, 2016. It conveys the characters and a 3D world based on the drama's.

 Soundtrack 
Chinese singer, Yisa Yu, released the single To Ask the Moon (问明月) as the series' theme song; the music video was released on January 15, 2016. The next OST single, The Wind's Love (风之恋) was released with its music video a week later, featuring Sharon Kwan's vocals. The songs were written by Yi Rui and composed by Gong Shu Jun. On January 28, Don't Make Me Cry (别惹哭我) was released with its music video. The song was written by Li Jiang Liang, composed by A Chao, and sung by Taiwanese singer, Claire Kuo.

Ratings 

 Highest ratings are marked in red, lowest ratings are marked in blue'''

References

External links 
 Legend of Nine Tails Fox on Weibo

Television series by Tangren Media
2016 Chinese television series debuts
Television shows based on Strange Stories from a Chinese Studio
2016 Chinese television series endings
Hunan Television dramas